Still Remains is a metalcore band from Grand Rapids, Michigan.

Still Remains may also refer to:

"Still Remains", song from Stone Temple Pilots album Purple
"Still Remains", song from Alter Bridge album AB III